WHCK-LP was a Religious formatted broadcast radio station.

While the station was licensed to Hopewell, Virginia, it only served the Colonial Heights/Petersburg/Ettrick area. WHCK-LP was owned and operated by Essence of Love Ministries. The FCC cancelled the station's license on June 17, 2011.

External links
 

HCK-LP
Radio stations established in 2004
Defunct radio stations in the United States
H
Defunct religious radio stations in the United States
Radio stations disestablished in 2011
2004 establishments in Virginia
2011 disestablishments in Virginia
HCK-LP